California Concert is a live album by saxophonist Bud Shank and flugelhornist Shorty Rogers recorded in 1985 and released on the Contemporary label.

Reception

Scott Yanow wrote in a review for AllMusic: "While Shank had advanced as an improviser (developing a wider range of expression and playing with more intensity than previously), Rogers' cool-toned style was largely unchanged".

Track listing
All compositions by Shorty Rogers, except where indicated.
 "It's Sand, Man!" (Ed Lewis) - 5:15
 "Makin' Whoopee" (Walter Donaldson, Gus Kahn) - 6:11
 "Kansas City Tango" - 5:28
 "Ah-Leu-Cha" (Charlie Parker) - 5:05
 "Echoes of Harlem" (Duke Ellington) - 9:18
 "Mia" - 4:56
 "Aurex" - 9:50

Personnel
Bud Shank - alto saxophone
Shorty Rogers - fluegelhorn, arranger
George Cables - piano
Monty Budwig - bass
Sherman Ferguson - drums

References

1985 live albums
Contemporary Records live albums
Bud Shank live albums
Shorty Rogers live albums